Glen Lake is a lake located in Northern Michigan. The lake consists of two large bodies of water connected by a narrow channel, which is traversed by a causeway carrying the famous highway M-22. The body of water on the west of this causeway, which is far shallower and more elongated, is known as Little Glen Lake, and the body of water east of the causeway, which is nearly perfectly round and deeper, is known as Big Glen Lake.

The lake empties into Lake Michigan via the shallow Crystal River which winds through Glen Arbor.

History 
The area around Glen Lake was first settled by the Odawa, Ojibwe, and Potawatomi peoples, all members of the Council of Three Fires. Since the foundation of nearby Glen Arbor in 1847, Glen Lake and the surrounding area had become very popular with tourists. In 1971, Sleeping Bear Dunes National Lakeshore was created adjacent to the lake to protect the natural beauty of the area.

Geography 
The lake is situated within the rolling hills and glens of Leelanau County, terrain that is relatively rare for Northwestern Michigan. However, this terrain is natural to the wooded sand hills of the neighboring Sleeping Bear Dunes National Lakeshore. From this terrain is where the lake derives its name.

Glen Lake is considered by many to be one of the most beautiful lakes in the Great Lakes region. Its waters, filtered by the underlying and surrounding sands, are remarkably clear and pure, and glow with an iridescent indigo blue. Its beauty, purity, and lack of large waves make it a popular lake for vacationers, with opportunities for boating, swimming, and fishing.  Sportfish include yellow perch, smallmouth bass, northern pike, brown trout, and lake trout.

See also
Pierce Stocking Scenic Drive
List of lakes in Michigan

External links

References

Lakes of Michigan
Lakes of Leelanau County, Michigan
Sleeping Bear Dunes National Lakeshore